Typex (born 1 September 1962 in Amsterdam) is a Dutch cartoonist. He is the winner of the 2019 Stripschapprijs.

References

Dutch cartoonists
Winners of the Stripschapsprijs
Living people
1962 births
Artists from Amsterdam
21st-century Dutch male artists